Juan Carlos Arcando (born 18 July 1961) is an Argentine politician and retired navy officer. He served as Vice Governor of Tierra del Fuego Province from 2015 to 2019, under Governor Rosana Bertone. In 2019, following Bertone's election to Congress, Arcando served as Governor for a week from 10 December to 17 December 2019. He belongs to the Justicialist Party.

Arcando was born in Río Tercero, Córdoba Province. He served in the Argentine Navy from 1977 to 1986, and was involved in logistical operations during the Falklands War. He served as a town councillor and as a member of the Provincial Legislature before being elected Vice Governor alongside Bertone in the 2015 provincial election.

In the 2019 general election, Bertone was elected to the National Chamber of Deputies. She took office on 10 December 2019, seven days before her successor to the governorship, Governor-elect Gustavo Melella, was due to be sworn in. Arcando then took office as governor to complete Bertone's four-year term for seven days.

During his seven-day term, Arcando caused a number of nationwide controversies, including commissioning a $450,000 ARS-gubernatorial baton for his inauguration ceremony, replacing the entire provincial cabinet (including the chief of police), increasing the governor's salary by 66%, and reincorporating a convicted thief to the provincial government.

References

External links

|-

1961 births
Living people
People from Córdoba Province, Argentina
Argentine Navy officers
Members of the Legislature of Tierra del Fuego
Vice Governors of Tierra del Fuego Province, Argentina
Governors of Tierra del Fuego Province, Argentina
Justicialist Party politicians
21st-century Argentine politicians
21st-century Argentine women politicians